The following highways are numbered 12C:

United States
 Nebraska Spur 12C
 New York State Route 12C (former)
 County Route 12C (Chenango County, New York)
 Secondary State Highway 12-C (Washington) (former)